Shopbop is a US online fashion apparel and accessories shop opened in 1999. It has been a subsidiary of Amazon.com since 2006.

History
Shopbop was founded by Bob Lamey, Martha Graettinger, and venture investor Ray Zemon in November 1999 in Madison, Wisconsin. It was originally the internet presence of brick and mortar clothing dealer Bop in downtown Madison (the shop was closed in 2014). Graettinger and Lamey chose Madison because it was a college town with strong fashion-conscious student base.

Shopbop was acquired by Amazon.com in February 2006. At the time of the deal it was selling 103 different lines of high-end clothing. Since the acquisition Shopbop ran almost completely independently from Amazon, that also sells clothes and accessories, and even competed with it. In September 2013 Shopbop opened the East Dane contemporary menswear website.

The website went through several redesigns, particularly in 2012 and 2017 (among the redesigns, a loyalty program was added to the website).

References

External links
 

Online clothing retailers of the United States
Companies based in Madison, Wisconsin
Amazon (company) acquisitions
Retail companies established in 1999
1999 establishments in Wisconsin
Internet properties established in 1999